Shan Ha Tsuen is a walled village in Yuen Long District, Hong Kong.

Administration
Shan Ha is a recognized village under the New Territories Small House Policy. Shan Ha Tsuen is one of the 37 villages represented within the Ping Shan Rural Committee. For electoral purposes, Shan Ha Tsuen is part of the Ping Shan South constituency.

Education
Shan Ha Tsuen is in Primary One Admission (POA) School Net 73. Within the school net are multiple aided schools (operated independently but funded with government money) and one government school: South Yuen Long Government Primary School (南元朗官立小學).

See also
 Walled villages of Hong Kong

References

Further reading

External links

 Delineation of area of existing village Shan Ha Tsuen (Ping Shan) for election of resident representative (2019 to 2022)

Walled villages of Hong Kong
Ping Shan
Villages in Yuen Long District, Hong Kong